Wendy Slaughter is a British former professional tennis player.

Slaughter, Scottish by birth, was a Scotland junior international but lived in Yorkshire.

After graduating from London University in 1972 she began to take up tennis more competitively and at the Wimbledon Championships that year fell in the final qualifying round to Tam O'Shaughnessy. She featured twice in the women's double main draw at Wimbledon during her career, including the second round in 1973.

References

External links
 

Year of birth missing (living people)
Living people
British female tennis players
Scottish female tennis players
Tennis people from West Yorkshire
Alumni of the University of London